ACAM2000 is a smallpox vaccine manufactured by Sanofi Pasteur Biologics Co. The vaccine provides protection against smallpox for people determined to be at high risk for smallpox infection.

Background 
Smallpox is considered a biological threat. Biological agents are toxins or organisms that can cause illness or death in humans, animals and plants. Exposure can come from an intentional biological terrorist attack, accidental release of the agent, or a natural accident.

Smallpox was eradicated in 1980. However, there has been interest in the development of vaccines due to the possible use of smallpox as a bioweapon.

Smallpox vaccine development 

Smallpox vaccine development is now in its second generation. First-generation vaccines were derived from calf-lymph, and include Dryvax, APVS, Lancy-vaxina and Lister. Second-generation vaccines are cell-cultured and include ACAM2000 and CCSV.

Both Dryvax and ACAM2000 come from the New York City Board of Health strain of vaccinia. Dryvax was grown on calf skin and then freeze-dried for storage. Dryvax was first licensed by the FDA in 1931; however, it is no longer manufactured. ACAM2000 is a second generation smallpox vaccine. It comes from a clone of Dryvax which is purified and produced using modern cell culture technology.

ACAM2000 history 
Emergent BioSolutions developed ACAM2000 under a contract with the U.S. Centers for Disease Control and Prevention (CDC).

The U.S. Food and Drug Administration (FDA) approved ACAM2000 in August 2007. By February 2008, it replaced Dryvax for all smallpox vaccinations.

As of 2010, there were over 200 million doses manufactured for the U.S. Strategic National Stockpile.

According to the U.S. FDA, "The approval and availability of this second-generation smallpox vaccine in the Strategic National Stockpile (SNS) enhances the emergency preparedness of the United States against the use of smallpox as a dangerous biological weapon."

Administration of ACAM2000 
The ACAM2000 vaccine is produced from the Vaccinia virus, which is sufficiently closely related to smallpox to provide immunity, but the ACAM2000 vaccine cannot cause smallpox because it does not contain the smallpox virus. Other vaccines containing live viruses include measles, mumps, rubella, polio and chickenpox.

The vaccine is administered using a bifurcated stainless steel needle. The needle is dipped into the vaccine solution and used to prick the skin several times in the upper arm. The vaccinia virus will begin to grow at the injection site. It will cause a localized infection, with a red itchy sore produced at the vaccination site within three to four days. If the infection occurs, that is an indication that the vaccine was successful. Ultimately, the sore turns into a blister and then dries up. A scab forms and then falls off in the third week, leaving a small scar behind.

Risks 
Administration of ACAM2000 can pose risks and cause side effects. Most people who have taken the vaccine report normal, usually mild reactions. These reactions include a sore arm, fever, and body aches. Some people may have side effects ranging from serious to life-threatening.

According to the FDA-approved prescribing information leaflet, "Common adverse events include inoculation site signs and symptoms, lymphadenitis, and constitutional symptoms, such as malaise, fatigue, fever, myalgia, and headache." These reactions are less frequent in people being revaccinated than those receiving the vaccine for the first time.

As far as pregnancy goes, it is recommended that the vaccine should be given to pregnant women who have been exposed to smallpox. No contraindications exist to receiving the vaccine in case of an outbreak emergency. "Because the risk of maternal serious illness or death, prematurity, miscarriage, or stillbirth from a smallpox infection are greater than the risk of the vaccination, smallpox vaccine is recommended and should be offered to pregnant women in case of an outbreak emergency."

References

External links
 ACAM2000 prescribing information 
 

Healthcare in the United States
History of immunology
Infectious diseases
Vaccine
Smallpox vaccines
Vaccines